The Mississippi Book Festival is an annual book festival in Jackson, Mississippi, U.S.. It has been held outside the Mississippi State Capitol every year since 2015. In 2017, Congressman Gregg Harper and author Richard Ford were in attendance.

References

Culture of Jackson, Mississippi
Literary festivals in the United States
2015 establishments in Mississippi